Bagrat IV (1565 – died after 1590), of the Bagrationi Dynasty, was a king of Imereti from 1589 to 1590. 

According to the mainstream Georgian scholarship, Bagrat was a son of Prince Teimuraz and a grandson of King Bagrat III of Imereti. Professor Cyril Toumanoff considered Bagrat to have been a son of another Teimuraz, son of Prince Vakhtang of Imereti.  

Enthroned through the support of Giorgi II Gurieli, prince of Guria, Bagrat briefly ruled during the civil war in Imereti until being deposed by Simon I of Kartli in 1590.

References

 Вахушти Багратиони (Vakhushti Bagrationi) (1745). История Царства Грузинского: Жизнь Имерети.

1565 births
Bagrationi dynasty of the Kingdom of Imereti
Kings of Imereti
Year of death unknown